Recently is the twentieth studio album (and twenty-second overall) by Joan Baez, released in 1987. It was her first album of new material issued in the US in eight years.

As she had done during the 1960s for Bob Dylan, Tim Hardin and Richard Farina, among others, Baez lent her voice to many of the songwriters of the day, in this case Mark Knopfler, U2, Peter Gabriel, and Johnny Clegg and found herself straddling a line between attempting to further connect with young audiences (many of whom first became acquainted with her through her appearances at Live Aid and Amnesty International's A Conspiracy of Hope Tour), while reintroducing herself to her established listeners, after such a long absence.

The track "Asimbonanga" was nominated for a Grammy Award for Best Contemporary Folk Recording.

Track listing

1987 albums
Joan Baez albums
Albums recorded at Capitol Studios